Kuenga Gyeltshen is a Bhutanese international footballer who currently plays for Druk United F.C. He made his first appearance in their second qualifying round matches and also featured in the 2015 SAFF Championship.

References

1992 births
Bhutanese footballers
Bhutan international footballers
Living people
Association football forwards